Hisham Kharma is an Egyptian musician. 

or The End, and for his soundtrack for Egypt: Land of Civilization documentary that was premiered during the Pharaohs' Golden Parade and starring Khaled El Nabawy.

Early life and education 
Kharma was born and raised in Cairo. He has started playing piano at the age of 9. Kharma obtained his BS in Computer science from the American University in Cairo and his postgraduate studies in art direction at Miami Ad School.

Biography 
Kharma started working in the field of advertising after graduation as a creative director, his first work was Ahl Masr Hospital for burns ad, after this work he was granted the title of Humanity Burn Free ambassador, for the initiative of the Ahl Masr for burns and for composing the music of Shoof B'albak.

In 2010, Kharma released his first official album, The First Voyage produced by Virgin Megastores, and followed by his second album released under Sony Music Entertainment records, where he was chosen to represent Egypt at one of Sony Music albums of the musical series, Arabesque with Yanni and Can Atilla. In November 2016, released his third album, AlyaQeen, Consisting of 13 music pieces and took about 3 years preparing for its release. Kharma’s fourth album, Kun Released in 2019, and featured 10 pieces of music.

In 2020, for the first time, Kharma composed the soundtrack for The End, the first Egyptian Sci-fi television drama series. That year, he composed the soundtrack for Mako, an Egyptian film adapted from the accident of the passenger ship, Salem Express that sank in the Red Sea in 1991.

In 2018, Kharma collaborated with Egyptian composer Omar Khairat, honoring the memory of Sheikh Zayed bin Sultan Al Nahyan and his moving memorial at 57357 Hospital. In the same year, Kharma composed the soundtrack for the opening and activities of the World Youth Forum held in Sharm El-Sheikh. Kharma collaborated with Tanvi Shah in a recording work titled Born Free.

Albums 

 2010, First Voyage
 2012, Arabesque
 2016, AlyaQeen
 2019, Kun

References

External links 

 Official website
 Law3andakdam

21st-century Egyptian musicians
Egyptian classical pianists
Egyptian electronic musicians
Egyptian composers
Egyptian record producers
Creative directors
Musicians from Cairo
The American University in Cairo alumni
Virgin Records artists
Sony Music artists
Year of birth missing (living people)
Living people